Lidcombe is a suburb in western Sydney, in the state of New South Wales, Australia. People from Lidcombe are colloquially known as Lidcombers or Lidcombiens.

Lidcombe is located west of Rookwood Cemetery, the largest cemetery in the Southern Hemisphere.

History 

Samuel Haslam owned various grants beside Haslams Creek from 1804. A railway station called Haslam's Creek  was opened in this area in 1859, on the railway line from Sydney to Parramatta. Haslam's Creek is sometimes referred to as Haslem's Creek.

Although it had not been intended to construct a station at Haslam's Creek, the then owner of the land where the station now stands, Father John Joseph Therry, together with nearby landholders Potts and Blaxland, agreed to pay £700 to enable its construction.

Haslam's Creek was the site of the first railway disaster in New South Wales in July 1858 which resulted in two deaths.

When the necropolis opened in 1867 it was known as Haslam's Creek Cemetery. Residents disliked the association with the burial ground and in 1876 the suburb was renamed Rookwood from a title of a novel by William Harrison Ainsworth (1805–1882). The name of the railway station was changed to Rookwood in 1878 and by the 1880s shops were established in the area. In 1891, the municipality of Rookwood was incorporated. Over time, the necropolis had become known as Rookwood Cemetery and by 1898 residents were again agitated about the association of their suburb with the cemetery. In 1913, a new name was suggested to honour the previous mayor Henry John Larcombe and the serving mayor Frederick Lidbury. Syllables from the name of each alderman (Lidbury and Larcombe) were combined to form the name Lidcombe on 1 January 1914. The municipality amalgamated with Auburn local government area in 1949.

A large number of post-WWII European migrants, including a large number of Ukrainians, settled in the area of Lidcombe, and built a number of buildings including a church, 2 halls and 2 schools. Lidcombe is still the cultural centre of the Ukrainian community in Sydney. The population dynamics changed with the influx of Middle Eastern immigrants in the 1960s and 1970s.

The two main streets are John and Joseph, named after the early colonial priest John Joseph Therry.

In 1989, the former industrial area in the north of the suburb, near the shores of Homebush Bay, was carved out to become a separate suburb named "Homebush Bay", as part of efforts to regenerate this area. This area was selected as the main venue for the 2000 Summer Olympics, and in 2009 was renamed Sydney Olympic Park, with a small part becoming a new residential suburb of Wentworth Point. At the same time, a small part of Sydney Olympic Park that has remained industrial, around Carter Street, was carved back into the suburb of Lidcombe.

Auburn Council was suspended in 2016 due to dysfunction, and later in 2016 it was abolished, with different parts of the former council area merged into different councils. Most of Lidcombe became part of the new Cumberland Council, while the small industrial area that was formerly part of Sydney Olympic Park became part of the City of Parramatta.

Heritage listings 
Lidcombe has a number of heritage-listed sites, including:
 East Street: Rookwood Cemetery and Necropolis
 Joseph Street: Lidcombe Hospital Precinct

Transport

Trains 

Lidcombe railway station is an important junction station. It is served by four suburban lines:
 the Olympic Park line to Sydney Olympic Park
 the North Shore & Western Line; east to Berowra or Hornsby via the City and Chatswood, west to either Richmond or Emu Plains via Parramatta
 the Inner West & Leppington Line; east to the City via Strathfield, west to Leppington via Granville
 the Bankstown line to the City via Bankstown

Some intercity Blue Mountains line services also call at the station.

A railway service from the Mortuary railway station, near Central railway station, once ran to a platform at the nearby Rookwood Cemetery, on the Rookwood Cemetery railway line but has since closed.

Bus services 
Transit Systems runs one route, Transdev NSW runs three routes and NightRide runs three routes via Lidcombe station. For full details of these services see Lidcombe Station.

Landmarks 

North of the railway line:
 Church Street is the site for the St Andrews Ukrainian Catholic Church and its presbytery, hall, school and kindergarten, and the former Karpaty Ukrainian Credit Union.
 John Street is the site of the Ukrainian Youth Association's Centre and the Armenian Catholic Church.

South of the railway line:
 Joseph Street is the site for the Ukrainian National Hall and the Ukrainian Central School. Nearby is the office of "The Free Thought" Ukrainian newspaper.
 Railway Hotel is an Art Deco building in Joseph Street which has a State heritage listing.
 Lidcombe Hotel, John Street, is heritage-listed
 Royal Oak Hotel, Railway Street, is heritage-listed
 The Gables is a historic home in East Street, now used as a function centre. The house has a state heritage listing.
 Juniperina Juvenile Justice Centre on Rookwood Road is a juvenile detention centre for girls. It is the only detention facility catering for juvenile female offenders in New South Wales. The Centre was also used as a filming location for the UK-Australian TV mini series, 'The Leaving of Liverpool'.
 Lidcombe Hospital was closed in the 1990s and was developed as a residential estate. The original complex was designed by Walter Liberty Vernon, Government Architect of the day, and built in 1906. It is now listed on the Register of the National Estate as well as being listed at a state level.
 Former Lidcombe Post Office, Joseph Street, is heritage-listed

Churches 

Lidcombe has many places of worship including:
 Sydney Grace Church   on 74 Joseph Street
 St Joachim's Catholic Church  on John Street and Mills Street
 Sts Cyril and Methodius Slovak Catholic Church in Vaughan Street.
 St Andrew's Ukrainian Catholic Church  (Byzantine style) on Church Street
 St Stephens Anglican Church on Mark Street
 Russian Orthodox Old Rite Church on Vaughan Street
 St Ephraim Syrian Orthodox Church on Joseph Street
 Lidcombe Baptist Church on Kerrs Road
 Our Lady of the Assumption Armenian Catholic Church on John Street
 Pacific Island Christian Church on Martin Street
 Christian Church on the corner of Olympic Drive and Vaughan Street
 GracePoint Presbyterian Church, on the corner of East and James Street
 St Marks Presbyterian Church in Yarram Street was closed
 Onnurri Korean Church in the Botanica Estate on Main Avenue

Schools 

Lidcombe Public School, located on John Street, was established in 1879. The school has 600 students from the Lidcombe area and also caters for special education children with trained teachers in that field. The school provides extra-curricular education facilities such as a choir, dance group and PSSA sports team. There is a before and after-school care program located within the school. There is transport to and from the school by the 925 and M92 bus routes.

St Joachim's Parish School  is a Catholic school on Mary Street. The Sisters of St Joseph founded the school in 1885 and remained active in the school until 1984. After that time the Sisters handed the Principalship over to lay staff who have continued to uphold the traditions and spirit of Blessed Mary MacKillop, who walked the playground and worked at the school, and her Josephite Sisters. The school caters for children up to Year 6.

Marist Brothers was a boys school located on Keating Street, behind St. Joachim's Catholic Church. It closed following the amalgamation of several Catholic schools in the area. The school catered for boys up to Year 6. This site is used for various Catholic Church enterprises, including the Inner Western Regional Office of the Catholic Education Office, Sydney, the Catholic Adult Education Centre and a bookstore specialising in Catholic publications ("The Mustard Seed").

Commercial area 

Lidcombe has a mixture of residential, commercial and industrial developments. The main commercial area is clustered around the station. Lidcombe Shopping Centre (formerly Lidcombe Power Centre) is a medium-sized shopping centre located about 2 km from Lidcombe railway station. The centre features two mini-majors and approximately 60 specialty stores.

Commercial and industrial developments are located along Parramatta Road and surrounding areas. The area close to the train station has a lot of restaurants mainly offering Korean food.

Industry 

 Macquarie Goodman own a couple of business parks on Parramatta Road and Birnie Avenue.
 The Dairy Farmers' distribution centre is located at Birnie Avenue. Dairy Farmers is a milk co-operative and supplied most of NSW's milk before competition was opened to milk suppliers from other states.
 Masons servicing the nearby Rookwood Cemetery are located on Railway Street
 Arthur Street business park just on the border with Strathfield Municipality.
 Dooley's Lidcombe Catholic Club (there are franchises in Silverwater and Regents Park too)
 McVicar's Bus Services depot was located at the corner of Joseph and James Streets. It closed in 1978.
 The headquarters of ASX listed Nick Scali Furniture established in 1962. The company now sports furniture shops throughout all of Australia.
 The Tooheys Brewery is located on the corner of Parramatta Road and Nyrang Street. The brewery site was bought in 1955 and the company is now part of the Lion Nathan conglomerate. The smell of the hops is noticeable around the area as it wafts through the air, especially during the night.
 The NSW Rural Fire Service headquarters was in Carter Street but has now moved nearby to Murray Rose Ave in Sydney Olympic Park. Carter Street was part of Lidcombe before the 2000 Sydney Olympics, but later became part of Homebush Bay. On 2 October 2009, the suburb of Homebush Bay was dismantled into two new suburbs, Sydney Olympic Park and Wentworth Point, with Carter Street reabsorbed into Lidcombe. The Olympic site was once a stockyard and abattoir.

Sport and recreation

Lidcombe Oval 

Lidcombe Oval, situated in Church Street, on the northern side of the railway line, was the home ground of the Western Suburbs Magpies from 1967–1986. The playing surface is enclosed by a cycling track. The ground earned a reputation as a fortress for the home side, particularly in the late 1970s to the early 1980s when the Magpies were at their most competitive. Games against rivals Parramatta Eels and Manly-Warringah Sea Eagles would usually draw large crowds during this era. The attendance record for the venue is 21,015 (Wests vs Parramatta, 30 July 1978).

Carnarvon Golf Course 

Carnarvon Golf Course, located at Nottinghill Road and Joseph Street, reflects the social history of Lidcombe. The first site was in use from 1927 to 1932 and occupied an area running east and west on the northern side of Parramatta Road, Lidcombe between Wetherill Street and Hill Road in an area currently covered by the M4 Western Motorway. The "Old Course" was in an area of three paddocks north of Fariola Street in an area owned by the Newington State Hospital (now Silverwater Correctional Centre) which consisted of nine holes in the top paddock (holes one-eight and eighteen). Seven holes in the bottom paddock, now Wilson Park, and the sixteenth and seventeenth holes in a paddock leased from Lidcombe Council on the southern side of Holker Street. This course was in use from 1932 until early 1943 when the top paddock and the Clubhouse were taken over by the U.S. Navy during World War II. The Silverwater Course was used from 1942 to 1949 and was a nine-hole course where the bottom paddock held holes one-two and five-nine with the third and fourth holes in the Council paddock. The present site which originally consisted of Lidcombe Sports and Showground and the western grazing paddock of Lidcombe State Hospital was obtained in 1947 and officially opened in December, 1949.

Ruth Everuss Aquatic Centre 

The Ruth Everuss Aquatic Centre (formerly known as the Auburn Swim Centre), located on Church Street, has indoor and outdoor swimming facilities. The centre was closed for major renovations and reopened again in 2017. The Centre is named after Ruth Everuss, the Australian Olympic swimmer was part of the silver medal-winning women's 4 × 100 m freestyle relay team at the 1960 Summer Olympics in Rome. Under the rules of the time, she did not receive a medal for swimming in the heats.

Demographics 
In the 2016 Census, there were 19,627 people in Lidcombe. 30.0% of people were born in Australia. The next most common countries of birth were South Korea 15.4%, China 11.2%, Vietnam 6.0%, Nepal 3.5% and India 2.5%. 19.0% of people only spoke English at home. Other languages spoken at home included Korean 17.9%, Mandarin 11.1%, Cantonese 10.3%, Arabic 4.2% and Vietnamese 4.0%. The most common responses for religion were No Religion 24.7%, Catholic 18.5% and Islam 9.7%.

Lidcombe was, up until recent years a traditional working-class suburb. Over the past decade, Lidcombe has experienced the processes of gentrification. Today, the suburb is cosmopolitan, reflecting the waves of immigration to post war Australia. Today, Lidcombe is home to a large Korean community. Many Korean run businesses such as restaurants, cafés, hairdressing and beauty services are located within the suburb.

Notable residents 
 Naazmi Johnston (1988–). An Olympic and Commonwealth gymnast. Represented Australia at the 2008 Olympic Games, the 2006, and 2010 Commonwealth Games.
 Rod Taylor (1930–2015). For some years after his Hollywood success, his mother still lived at a local street (reference: Schoolfriends messageboard, now inactive). He went to Parramatta High School.
 Michael Wenden (1949–). An Olympic swimmer, attended Marist Brothers Lidcombe; he won gold in the 100 m and 200 m freestyle, silver in the 800 m freestyle relay and bronze in the 400 m freestyle relay at the 1968 Mexico City Olympics.

References

Notes 

 Mitchell, John (2008) 'John Joseph Therry – His Lidcombe Property' Australian Railway History, September, 2008 pp. 308–310
 NSW Parliament (2003) Legislative Assembly Hansard Full Day Transcript: Parramatta High School
 Pollen, Frances (1990) The Book of Sydney Suburbs, Angus & Robertson Publishers, Australia 
 Stafford, Ted (1991) Living in Liddy Ettalong Beach, NSW

External links

  [CC-By-SA]
  [CC-By-SA]

Suburbs of Sydney
Cumberland Council, New South Wales